Maggy de Coster (born April 23, 1966) is a Haitian-born writer living in France. Until 1987 (or possibly somewhat later), she wrote under her birth name Margareth Lizaire and is also known as Margareth Lizaire de Coster.

Biography
She is a member of the French . She has worked as a journalist in Haiti, France, Switzerland, England and Barbados.

In 2000, she established the literary journal Manoir des Poètes and serves as its director. De Coster is a member of the French Société des gens de lettres and has served on the executive committee of the Société des poètes français. Her work has been included in a number of anthologies and has been translated into Spanish, Italian, English, Romanian and Arabic.

She is married and has four children.

Awards and honours
De Coster received the Prix Jean-Cocteau in 2004 and the Prix de la chanson poétique in 2007 from the Grand concours international de Poésie Richelieu.

Selected works 
 Nuits d’assaut, poetry (1981)
 Ondes Vives, poetry (1987)
 Rêves et Folie, poetry (1994)
 Mémoires inachevés d’une île moribonde, poetry (1995), received first prize for poetry from the Académie Internationale Il Convivio
 , essay (1996)
 Itinéraire interrompu d’une jeune femme journaliste, autobiography (1998), received the ruby Medal from the 
 La Tramontane des Soupirs ou le siège des marées, poetry (2002), received the ruby Medal from the Académie Internationale de Lutèce
 Petites histoires pour des nuits merveilleuses, children's stories (2004)
 Le Chant de Soledad, novel (2007), received the silver medal from the Académie Internationale de Lutèce 
 Le Journalisme expliqué aux non-initiés, non-fiction (2007)
 Au gué des souvenirs, stories (2008)
 La sémaphore du temps, poetry (2010)
 Doux ramages pour petits diablotins, poems for children (2010)

References

External links 
 |Official website

1966 births
Living people
Haitian journalists
Haitian women poets
Haitian women journalists
Haitian expatriates in France
People from Grand'Anse (department)
Paris 2 Panthéon-Assas University alumni
20th-century Haitian poets
20th-century Haitian women writers
21st-century Haitian poets
21st-century Haitian women writers